Chaubandi Cholo is a traditional woman's blouse of Nepali culture. The blouse is typically wrapped and can have an open or closed neck.  It is often worn with a sārī-like wrapped skirt. A chaubandi cholo is often cotton in a red or white geometric print, however different color and use can distinguish different Nepali cultures.

Wearing the chaubandi cholo as traditional wear has been encouraged by certain nationalist groups in Nepal and West Bengal.

References

Nepalese clothing
Embroidery
Needlework
Saris
Tops (clothing)
Embroidery in India